Mitragyna parvifolia is a tree species found in Asia,  native to India and Sri Lanka. Mitragyna species are used medicinally and for their fine timber throughout the areas where they grow. M. parvifolia reaches heights of 50 feet with a branch spread over 15 feet. The stem is erect and branching. Flowers are yellow and grow in ball-shaped clusters. Leaves are a dark green in color, smooth, rounded in shape, and opposite in growth pattern.

Traditional uses
Mitragyna parvifolia fresh leaf sap is used by the tribals in treatment of jaundice in the Chenchus, Yerukalas, Yanadis and Sugalis of Gundur District, Andhra Pradesh. Its leaves alleviate pain and swelling, and are used  for better healing from wounds and ulcers. Its stem bark is used in treatment of biliousness and muscular pains by the local inhabitant of Tumkur district, Karnataka, India. The tribals of Sonaghati of Sonbhadra district, Uttar Pradesh heal fever by a decoction of the M. parvifolia bark. Valaiyans tribe, population of Sirumalai hills, Madurai district, Western Ghats, Tamil Nadu use stem bark for rheumatic pain. The bark and roots are used to treat fever, colic, muscular pain, burning sensation, poisoning, gynecological disorders, cough, and edema,  and as an aphrodisiac. The fruit juice augments the quantities of breast milk in lactating mothers and also works as lactodepurant.

The caterpillars of the commander (Limenitis procris), a brush-footed butterfly, use this species as a food plant.

In religion
According to ancient literature, this is the 'true Kadam' which is associated with Lord Krishna in Vrindavana, rather than the well-known tree Neolamarckia cadamba. But this is definitely a case of mistaken identity. Neolamarckia Cadamba is not found naturally in the hot, dry Vrindavana region. M. parviflora is not only native to the Vrindavana forests but is their dominant tree. Interestingly, M. parviflora are still found almost everywhere in Vrindavana.

Gallery

References

External links

Naucleeae
Flora of the Indian subcontinent